Federico "Fede" Gallego Revetria (born 13 June 1990) is a Uruguayan professional footballer who plays as an attacking midfielder for Indian Super League club ATK Mohun Bagan.

Career

NorthEast United
Gallego was loaned from Boston River to NorthEast United for the 2018–19 Indian Super League season. He scored a goal on his debut for NorthEast United against Goa. Along with teammate Bartholomew Ogbeche, he formed one of the best attacking combinations for the club. Gallego won the Fans' Player of the Month award for October in an online poll conducted by the league.

On 21 September 2020, Gallego signed a contract extension, keeping him at NorthEast United until the end of the 2020–21 season. Gallego won the Hero of the Month award for January in an online poll conducted by the league. He finished the season with 4 goals and 6 assists in all competitions, becoming NorthEast United's all-time single-season top assist provider.

On 29 September 2021, NorthEast United and Gallego have agreed a one-year contract extension for the upcoming season. On November 29, Gallego was drafted in the starting XI for the first time this season against Chennaiyin FC. In this match, Gallego was involved in a clash with Chennaiyin FC’s Narayan Das. Gallego has his knee injured in the coming together and was carried out on a stretcher. He ruled out from the season due to his knee injury.
For the 2022–23 season NEUFC decided not to retain Gallego after the club wanted to create a new policy. Gallego is the most loved footballer of NEUFC. Fans call him as the "King of the Highlands" for his successful contribution to the club. Even rivals also admit the skills shown by this wonderful player.

Sud América
On 3 September 2022, Gallego joined Uruguayan Segunda División club Sud América.

Career statistics

Club

Honours

Sud América
Uruguayan Segunda División: 2012–13

ATK Mohun Bagan
Indian Super League: 2022–23

Individual
Indian Super League Fans' Player of the Month: October 2018
Indian Super League Hero of the Month: January 2021

References

External links 
 
 

1990 births
Living people
Uruguayan footballers
Uruguayan expatriate footballers
Argentinos Juniors footballers
Sud América players
NorthEast United FC players
Argentine Primera División players
Expatriate footballers in Argentina
Association football midfielders
Uruguayan expatriate sportspeople in India